The 1983 Champ Car season may refer to:
 the 1982–83 USAC Championship Car season, which included one race in 1983, the 67th Indianapolis 500
 the 1983–84 USAC Championship Car season, which included one race in 1984, the 68th Indianapolis 500
 the 1983 CART PPG Indy Car World Series, sanctioned by CART, who later became Champ Car